The ribbon sawtail fish, Idiacanthus fasciola, is a barbeled dragonfish of the family Stomiidae, found around the world at depths over 500 m between latitudes 40° N and 54° S.  Length is up to 35 cm in general for the female, and 15 cm for the male.

References

 
 Tony Ayling & Geoffrey Cox, Collins Guide to the Sea Fishes of New Zealand,  (William Collins Publishers Ltd, Auckland, New Zealand 1982) 
https://archive.today/20130212144646/http://filaman.uni-kiel.de/LarvalBase/Summary/LarvaSummary.cfm?genusname=Idiacanthus&speciesname=fasciola

Stomiidae
Taxa named by Wilhelm Peters
Fish described in 1877